George Washington Slept Here is a 1942 comedy film starring Jack Benny, Ann Sheridan, Charles Coburn, Percy Kilbride, and Hattie McDaniel. It was based on the 1940 play of the same name by Moss Hart and George S. Kaufman, adapted by Everett Freeman, and was directed by William Keighley.

Warner Archives released the film on DVD in November 2013. George Washington Slept Here was cited in the John Wayne film Operation Pacific (1951) when two American submarines traded films at sea.

Plot
Manhattanite Connie Fuller (Ann Sheridan) secretly acquires a dilapidated house in rural Bucks County, Pennsylvania, without her husband Bill's (Jack Benny) knowledge. The couple were forced out of their New York City apartment after their dog damaged the carpets. The house Connie buys is believed to have served as George Washington's temporary home during the Revolutionary War. Connie takes Bill on a tour of the countryside including the house, hoping that Bill will fall in love with it.

Connie's plan is to surprise her husband with the news that they own the house but is frustrated when he announces that he hates it. Bill only sees the poor condition of the house, and its poor location for commuting into the city. Having nowhere else to live, they move into the house anyway. Connie's sister Madge (Joyce Reynolds) moves with them. They hire Mr. Kimber (Percy Kilbride) to help with the renovations. They uncover evidence that it was not Washington who had slept there, but Benedict Arnold. Connie's spoiled nephew Raymond (Douglas Croft) also moves in during the summer. Connie's wealthy uncle Stanley (Charles Coburn) plans to visit also.

One rainy day, married actors Rena Leslie (Lee Patrick) and Clayton Evans (John Emery) seek shelter from the downpour. Madge falls in love with Clayton and plans to run away with him, abandoning Rena. Bill suspects Connie of infidelity with local antiques dealer Jeff Douglas (Harvey Stephens), and confronts her. Connie explains that Jeff helped her determine that they own a well and an access road - facilities that their unfriendly neighbor Prescott (Charles Dingle) claims as his.

Prescott uses the poor state of the Fullers' house to engineer a foreclosure against them, intending to buy their forfeited property at auction afterward. The Fullers desperately seek funds to finish the renovations and stave off the foreclosure. They ask Stanley to finance them, but he reveals that he has been secretly bankrupt since the Depression in 1929. Instead, he helps them with their lawful claim to the well and service road. Everything changes for the better when the Fullers' dog digs up a boot on the property, containing a letter written by George Washington.  The valuable historical find is worth enough money for the couple to complete the renovations, and stave off Prescott's attempts to buy them out.

The arrival of the expected 17-year locusts leads to the accidental discovery of the well that the couple need.

Cast

 Jack Benny as Bill Fuller
 Ann Sheridan as Connie Fuller
 Charles Coburn as Uncle Stanley J. Menninger
 Percy Kilbride as Mr. Kimber, the handyman
 Hattie McDaniel as Hester, the Fullers' maid
 William Tracy as Steve Eldridge
 Joyce Reynolds as Madge
 Lee Patrick as Rena Leslie
 Charles Dingle as Mr. Prescott
 John Emery as Clayton Evans
 Douglas Croft as Raymond
 Harvey Stephens as Jeff Douglas

Production
Jack Benny was starring in his first Warner Bros. feature and when the stage play George Washington Slept Here was proposed, Benny took in a performance. In the original stage production, it was the husband, not the wife, who bought the property, and had been the "straight man". The focus was changed for the film, reversing the roles to play into Benny's established persona of being a miser as well as the comic foil. Originally, Olivia de Havilland was to be cast as the female lead.

To recreate the country home that was central to the film's plot, the house in Arsenic and Old Lace (1944) which was actually shot in 1941 for a later theatrical release, was used. To ensure it looked the part of a dilapidated home, Warner Bros. crews knocked out bannisters, rafters and floors on the set.

Reception
George Washington Slept Here was reviewed by Bosley Crowther for The New York Times. He said, "... just knock-about fun. Mr. Benny goes through his paces with his customary strain on shoe-leather, whines and pulls his hair (figuratively) with the air of a martyred saint. Miss Sheridan plays straight to his foibles, but does so quite fetchingly, and Percy Kilbride is highly amusing as a dead-panned, laconic hired hand. Charles Coburn plays the four-flushing uncle with gleeful treachery and Hattie McDaniel, Douglas Croft and Charles Dingle are amusing in other roles."

Awards and honors
George Washington Slept Here was nominated for an Oscar for Best Art Direction for Max Parker, Mark-Lee Kirk and Casey Roberts.

Adaptations to other media
George Washington Slept Here was adapted as a half-hour radio play for the November 8, 1943 broadcast of The Screen Guild Theater, starring Carole Landis and Jack Carson. It was also presented on the November 23, 1947 broadcast of the Ford Theatre with Karl Swenson and Claudia Morgan in lead roles.

See also
 Mr. Blandings Builds His Dream House
 The Money Pit

References

Notes

Bibliography

 Jack Benny: The Radio and Television Work.  New York: HarperPerennial, 1991. .

External links

 
 
 
 

1942 films
1942 comedy films
American comedy films
American black-and-white films
American films based on plays
Warner Bros. films
Films directed by William Keighley
Films scored by Adolph Deutsch
1940s English-language films
1940s American films